The Business School may refer to:

 Saïd Business School at the University of Oxford, which has been colloquially referred to as The Business School since 1999, and by The Oxford Student since 2002
 A business school, a university-level institution that confers degrees in business administration
 "Business School" (The Office), an episode of the American comedy television series The Office
 Cass Business School changed its name to City's Business School, and later changed its name to The Business School, stylized as The Business School (formerly Cass)